Miss Brazil World 2013 was the 24th edition of the Miss Brazil World pageant and 8th under MMB Productions & Events. The contest took place on April 6, 2013. Each state, the Federal District and various Insular Regions & Cities competed for the title. Mariana Notarângelo of Rio de Janeiro crowned Sancler Frantz of Ilha dos Lobos at the end of the contest. Frantz represented Brazil at Miss World 2013. The contest was held at the Portobello Resort & Safari in Mangaratiba, Rio de Janeiro, Brazil.

Results

Regional Queens of Beauty

Special Awards

Challenge Events

Beauty with a Purpose

Beach Beauty

Miss Talent

Miss Top Model

Multimedia

Sports

Delegates
The delegates for Miss Brazil World 2013 were:

States

 - Vanessa Guimarães
 - Priscilla Durand
 - Raíssa Machado
 - Priscilla Rebêlo
 - Nicole Müller
 - Ruanna Fernandes
 - Graziela Souza
 - Raquel Benetti
 - Lilian Leite
 - Isadora Macêdo
 - Ângela Trampusch
 - Ilda Lando
 - Adelaine Castro
 - Thalita Maués
 - Nathália Taveira
 - Talita Akemi Pan
 - Taynara Gargantini
 - Sueidys Peixoto
 - Gabriele Marinho
 - Heloiza Campos
 - Luciane Escouto
 - Patrícia Balbi
 - Soraia Lustoza
 - Thainara Latenik
 - Zaidan Ribeiro
 - Ingrid Vieira
 - Natasha Marinho

Insular Regions

 Alcatrazes - Aline Pierre
 Atol das Rocas - Flávia Fernandes
 Florianópolis Islands - Sara Ramos
 Ilhabela - Marcela Yamaguti
 Ilha da Pintada - Tamara Bicca
 Ilha do Marajó - Fabyane Nascimento
 Ilha do Mel - Viviane Di Domênico
 Ilha dos Lobos - Sancler Frantz
 Ilha dos Marinheiros - Maria Lua Strëit
 Ilha Grande - Gabrielle Vilela

References

External links
 Official site (in Portuguese)

2013
2013 in Brazil
2013 beauty pageants